Atanas is a fortress in Serbia. It is located 8 km southeast from Pirot, near the village Krupac. It was an ancient settlement in the area in the 6th century BC. Today remains of the keep can be seen.

See also 
 List of fortifications in Serbia

References 

Forts in Serbia